Ääripäät is the fifth studio album by Finnish rapper Mikael Gabriel. It was released on 1 June 2018. According to Gabriel, the album is happier and less "deep" than his previous ones.

Track listing

Charts

Release history

References

2018 albums
Mikael Gabriel albums